Paliurus spina-christi, commonly known as Jerusalem thorn, garland thorn, Christ's thorn, or crown of thorns, is a species of Paliurus native to the Mediterranean region and southwest and central Asia, from Morocco and Spain east to Iran and Tajikistan.

Description
It is a deciduous shrub or small tree growing to 3–4 m tall. The shoots are zig-zagged, with a leaf and two stipular spines (one straight, one curved) on the outside of each kink. The leaves are oval, 2–5 cm long and 1–4 cm broad, glossy green, with an entire margin. The fruit is a dry woody nutlet centred in a circular wing 2–3.5 cm diameter.

Etymology
As suggested by the Latin name and by an ancient oral tradition , the spiny branches of this shrub were supposedly used to make the crown of thorns placed on Christ's head before his crucifixion. Ziziphus spina-christi, the Christ's thorn jujube, is also identified as being used for the crown of thorns.

Use
It is viewed as an ornamental curiosity and is cultivated in some areas outside its native range, including Fiji.

Gallery

References
Flora Europaea: Paliurus spina-christi

Rushforth, K. D. (1999). Trees of Britain and Europe. .
Flora Vitiensis Nova. Volume 3. Albert C. Smith. VI. 694 pp. Pacific Tropical Botanical Garden. Lawai, Kauai, Hawaii. 1985

External links
 

Rhamnaceae
Plants described in 1753
Taxa named by Carl Linnaeus
Trees of Mediterranean climate
Taxa named by Philip Miller
Flora of the Mediterranean Basin